Daniel James Nolan (5 February 1987 – 1 January 2002) was an English boy who vanished around midnight on New Year's Day 2002 from the Hampshire harbour town of Hamble-le-Rice after a fishing expedition with a group of friends.

Background
Daniel (called "Dan" by friends and family) was born 5 February 1987, and was the eldest of five children. He was an avid fisher, growing up by the seaside, and was very experienced.

Disappearance
On the evening of New Year's Day, 2002, Daniel went fishing with a group of friends. He had told his parents that he would be back around 2am. He was last seen outside the Victory Pub in the village, where he left the group to go back to pontoon to collect his fishing gear. His parents then reported him missing after he failed to arrive back home after 2am. Police arrived shortly after at the pontoon where Daniel was heading, and divers searched the waters looking for any clues surrounding Daniel's whereabouts, although failing light and a high tide made further searching difficult. But the search was unsuccessful, and no trace of Daniel was found.

Aftermath
On May 15, 2003, human remains of feet encased in two socks where found in Chapman's Pool, a remote area in Swanage, Dorset, miles away from where he went missing. DNA evidence later positively identified it as Daniel's, and he was confirmed dead.

Play
The story was later adapted into a play by award-winning playwright Mark Wheeller, who was inspired to write the play after seeing posters of Daniel outside his local Tesco. Missing Daniel Nolan was published by Salamander Street in 2020.

References

Missing British children
Missing English children
2000s missing person cases